Paroxysmal tachycardia is a form of tachycardia which begins and ends in an acute (or paroxysmal) manner.

It is also known as "Bouveret-Hoffmann syndrome".

Cause
The cause of this condition is not accurately known, though it is probably of nervous origin and can be aggravated by physical wear and tear. The symptoms are sometimes very alarming but it is not considered in itself dangerous.

It has an increased risk of developing in WPW syndrome and LGL syndrome.

Diagnosis

Classification
It can be divided by the origin:
 supraventricular tachycardia
 ventricular tachycardia

References

Cardiac arrhythmia
Symptoms and signs: Cardiac
Syndromes affecting the heart